Luhrs and Crawford  is an Australian Country music duo of Grant Luhrs and Hugh Crawford. Their album Midnight in Paradise was nominated for a 1991 ARIA Award for Best Country Album.

Discography

Albums

Awards and nominations

ARIA Music Awards
The ARIA Music Awards are a set of annual ceremonies presented by Australian Recording Industry Association (ARIA), which recognise excellence, innovation, and achievement across all genres of the music of Australia. They commenced in 1987. 

! 
|-
| 1991 || Midnight In Paradise || ARIA Award for Best Country Album ||  ||

References

Australian country music groups
Musical groups established in 1982
Musical groups disestablished in 1991